Parque Marques da Silva is a multi-use stadium in Ovar, Aveiro, Portugal. It is currently used mostly for football matches and is the home stadium of A.D. Ovarense. It is also the home to Ovarense's U19s, U17s, U15s and B teams. The stadium was built in 1954 and is able to hold a seating capacity of 3,200 people.

References

External links
 Official Site
 Stadium Profile at ZeroZero

Football venues in Portugal
Sport in Ovar
Sports venues in Aveiro District
Buildings and structures in Ovar
Sports venues completed in 1954